Tanapol Udomlap, born February 15, 1989, is a Thai professional footballer who plays as a Centre-back

References

External links
  at Soccerway

1989 births
Living people
Tanapol Udomlap
Association football defenders
Samutsongkhram F.C. players
Tanapol Udomlap
Tanapol Udomlap
Tanapol Udomlap